The Bayerische Verfassungsmedaille (Bavarian Constitution Medal) is an award by the German state Bavaria, which is awarded annually by the Bavarian state parliament to persons who have rendered outstanding services to the Bavarian constitution. The medal is given in Silver and Gold.

The medal was established on 1 December 1961, donated by the then president of parliament , as the necessity arose to honour long-serving members of parliament.  The inscription on the medal is "Bayerische Verfassung" (Bavarian constitution) with the Roman year figures MDCCCXVIII (1818), MCMXIX (1919) and MCMXLVI (1946), the obverse shows the Coat of arms of Bavaria.

On 20 July 2011, the medal was elevated to the rank of an order.

Recipients 

Many politicians received the medal, including Franz Götz and Sabine Leutheusser-Schnarrenberger. Members of the Bavarian parliament receive it usually after three legislative periods (formerly 12 years, now 15 years of service), ministers typically after one term (formerly 4 years, now five years). The medal has been awarded also to artists such as ballerina Konstanze Vernon, and clerics such as Joseph Aloisius Ratzinger, the later pope.

2001 

 Kurt Faltlhauser
 Ingo Friedrich
 Erwin Huber

2002 

 Reinhold Bocklet
 Josef Deimer
 Franz Götz
 Karl Freller

2004 

 Johannes Friedrich
 Christian Ude

2005 

 Karl Freller
 Charlotte Knobloch
 Ernst Pöppel

2006 

 Manfred Christ
 Heinz Donhauser
 Ernst-Ludwig Winnacker

2007 

 Otmar Bernhard
 Ruth Drexel
 Mieczysław Pemper
 Gisela Stein
 Klaus Dieter Breitschwert
 Peter Radtke
 Siegfried Schneider (politician)

2008 

 Herbert Ettengruber
 Ingrid Fickler
 Heidi Lück
 Marion Schick
 Jutta Speidel

2009 

 Dieter Dorn
 Max Mannheimer
 Horst Seehofer
 Ludwig Stiegler
 Dieter Borchmeyer
 Walter Kolbow
 Bernd Posselt

2010 

 Michael Glos
 Theodor W. Hänsch
 Gerda Hasselfeldt
 Ludwig Schick
 Siegfried Schneider
 Senta Berger
 Renate Dodell
 Peter Maffay
 Angelika Niebler

2011 

 Reinhard Marx
 Waltraud Meier
 Iris Berben
 Wolfgang Kreissl-Dörfler
 Peter Landau
 Eduard Oswald
 Claudia Roth

2012 

 Franz Beckenbauer
 Peter Lerche
 Ilse Aigner
 Verena Bentele
 Max Stadler

2013 

 Hans-Jürgen Buchner
 Mahbuba Maqsoodi
 Marcus H. Rosenmüller

2017 
 Jacques Chagnon

References

External links 
 Informationen des Bayerischen Landtages zur Bayerischen Verfassungsmedaille 

German awards
Culture of Bavaria
Awards established in 1961
1961 establishments in West Germany
Long service medals